Champia laingii is a marine red algal species endemic to New Zealand.

It is a striking small seaweed, it is dark red but often shows an iridescent blue or green colour. It grows up to 40 cm and is often appears as a tangled mat.

It is usually found around the edges of rock pools at low tide, but also grows on some of the big seaweeds.

Habitat 
Champia laingii  frequently disappears from localities for long periods. It is found near low-water mark at the edges of shallow pools often growing on (and sheltered by)  Carpophyllum maschalocarpum, Xiphophora chondrophylla, and sometimes on Zonaria sinclairii. It also attach is found attached to fragments of shell, sand, and rock. The plant seems to prefer shallow pools and channels on roughly horizontal platforms having running water.

Type specimen 
The type specimen was found on Long Beach, at Russell, in the Bay of Islands by Vincent Wilhelm Lindauer (AK 143927).

References

External links
Champia laingii occurrence data from GBIF
 Museum of New Zealand Te Papa Tongarewa: Champia laingii Lindauer (Species)
Champia laingii images, etc

Flora of New Zealand
Rhodymeniales